Beechwood Park  is a neighbourhood within the urban area of Municipality of Halifax, Nova Scotia, Canada.

Geography
Beechwood Park is located within the urban area of Halifax--more specifically, between the communities of Fairview, and Rockingham. The landmass of Beechwood Park is fairly compact at 75 hectares (0.75 km2).

Demographics
Although Beechwood Park is a well-established neighbourhood within the urban area of Halifax, there are no demographic estimates for the neighbourhood.

Transportation
The Bedford Highway goes through community, and connects Beechwood Park to Fairview to the south, and Rockingham to the north. Bayview Road connects to Lacewood Drive, which will connect the traveller to the community of Clayton Park. Several transit routes traverse its boundaries.

Halifax Transit Routes

Route 39 (Flamingo)
Route 90 (Larry Uteck)
Route 91 (Hemlock Ravine)
Route 93 (Bedford Highway)
Route 196 (Basinview Express)

References

 Destination Nova Scotia

Communities in Halifax, Nova Scotia